Alvania sleursi is a species of minute sea snail, a marine gastropod mollusk or micromollusk in the family Rissoidae.

References

Gastropods described in 1987
Rissoidae